Gérard Rancinan is a French photographer whose work has appeared in publications such as Sports Illustrated, Time, Life, The Sunday Times Magazine, and Paris Match.

Life and work
Gérard Rancinan started his career as an apprentice in the laboratory of the photo department of the Bordeaux daily newspaper, Sud Ouest. After three years as an apprentice, he became the youngest photojournalist in France at the age of 18, covering news around the region. When he was 21, he was sent to the newspaper's agency in Pau.

Having been spotted by the newly founded press agency, Sygma, in 1973, Rancinan decided to sign a distribution contract with the firm. Five years later he became a Sygma staff photographer in Paris. He covered current events - earthquakes in Algeria to political upheaval in Poland, war in Lebanon, riots in England; sporting events (Olympic Games, Football World Cups, World Athletics Championships); movie shoots (Ran by Akira Kurosawa, Betty Blue by Jean-Jacques Beineix, The Last Emperor by Bernardo Bertolucci); show business, fashion and the cinema.

He left Sygma in 1986 to set up his own agency, before once again becoming independent in 1989.

His portraits of leading personalities (Fidel Castro, Pope John Paul II, François Mitterrand, Monica Bellucci, Tiger Woods, Yasser Arafat, Bill Gates, etc.) and his photographic "sagas" describing major societal developments have been published on the front pages of magazines Paris Match, Life, Stern, The Sunday Times Magazine. Since 1984, Rancinan has also worked on a regular basis with Sports Illustrated. In his projects, he collaborates with writers, journalists, thinkers, sociologists, anthropologists and philosophers (Caroline Gaudriault, Virginie Luc, Paul Virilio, Francis Fukuyama etc.).

In the 1990s, Pierre Cornette de Saint-Cyr produced Rancinan's exhibition Urban Jungle at the Espace Cardin in Paris in 2000. Rancinan's work has been exhibited in galleries and museums (Barcelona Museum of Contemporary Art: "Portrait of Nathalie", Triennale di Milano: "Portraits of Cardinals", Palais de Tokyo Muséum, Paris: "Metamorphoses") "Trilogy of the Moderns", Triennale di Milano - Contemporary Art Museum, Italie. and is held in private contemporary art collections.

At an auction at the Étude Million at the l'Hôtel Drouot in 2008, his work sold at a price comparable with the upper echelons of French contemporary art photographers. His photograph, "Batman Girls", sold for a record price in London in May 2012 at the auction house, Philip de Pury. The sale of Rancinan's "The Feast of the Barbarians" by the Étude Pillon in Versailles on 18 May 2014 – achieved the highest price of any living French photographer.

Rancinan photographs his contemporaries and analyses the behaviours and beliefs characterizing modern societies.

Rancinan's photographs are studied in schools in France within the framework of the National Diploma (DNB) in the History of Art.

On 7 January 2013 Laurent Fabius, the French Minister of Foreign Affairs, invited Rancinan to display, in one of the rooms of the Quai d'Orsay his photograph "Batman Boys", promoting the work of contemporary French artists abroad.

Prizes and awards
Rancinan has won four first prizes at the World Press Photo Awards, in 1983, 1986 and 1988 (twice).
"Picture of the Year International" in 2004 at the POY Awards - Missouri School of Journalism, US.
Rancinan was made Chevalier des Arts et des Lettres in 2006 by the then French Minister of Culture, Renaud Donnedieu de Vabres. He was made Officier des Arts et des Lettres by the French Minister of Culture, Aurélie Filippetti in January 2013.

Most recent solo exhibitions
June–July 2007: Trilogy of the Sacred Savage, Triennale Bovisa di Milano Museum, Italy
September 2008: The Photographer, Museum Palazzo Roma, Italy
October 2009: Metamorphoses, still lives and conversations, Galerie Brugier-Rigail, Paris
November–December 2009: Métamorphoses, Palais de Tokyo Museum of Contemporary Art, Paris
March–April 2011: Rancinan in Paris, Opera Gallery London-Paris
September–October 2011 : Rancinan in London, Opera Gallery, London
October–November 2011: Hypotheses, Chapelle Saint-Sauveur, Issy-les-Moulineaux, France
November–December 2011: Rancinan in Hong Kong, Opera Gallery Hong Kong
April–May 2012: Trilogy of the Moderns, Triennale di Milano Museum, Italy
May–June 2012: Wonderful World, The Future Tense, curated by Ed Barttlet, London
September–October 2012: Wonderful World, Galerie Valérie Bach, Royal Icerink, Brussels, Belgium
May–September 2013: Trilogy of the Moderns + Chaos, Danubiana Meulensteen Art Museum, Bratislava, Slovakia
 October–November 2013 : The Feast of Barbarrian - Musée des arts et métiers- Paris
 February–April 2014 : "Motopoetique"-MAC-Musée d'art contemporain de Lyon-Collective Exhibition-curator Paul Ardenne
 April–June 2014 : "A Small Man in a Big World" - Avant Premiere - Galerie Valerie Bach - Brussels - Belgium
 June- September 2014 : " Tupi or not Tupi" - " Salomé Détail" - collective Exhibition  - oscar Niemeyer Museum- Curitiba - Brazil
 June–September 2014 : " Festin de l'Art " - "The Big Supper" - collective Exhibition - Pinault collection - Dinard - France- curator Jean Jacques Aillagon

Films
Sauvons l'amour, with Gabrielle Lazur, Fred Carol, François Siener. Original music by Charlélie Couture, 1986 (11 minutes. 40 seconds, 35 mm). Fiction/Short Film.
Héritage - Voyage au Pays de l'Homme, TF1, 52 min, 1995. Documentary.
Trilogy of the Moderns - Behind The Scenes,  documentary, making of, on the work of Gérard Rancinan and Caroline Gaudriault, 52 min. Directed by Vincent Tavernier with commentaries by Paul Ardenne, art historian. French and English version, December 2012. Documentary.

Books 
 Rois Sans Royaume, Éditions Nathan Image, 1986
 Urban Jungle, Éditions de La Martinière, 1999
 Rancinan Exploit, Edition Federico Motta, Milan, 2004
 La Trilogie du Sacré Sauvage, Edition Federico Motta, Milan, 2005
 The Photographer, Edition Abrams, New York, 2008
 Le Photographe, Éditions de La Martinière, 2008
 "Métamorphoses", conversations & natures mortes, Biro & Cohen éditeurs, 2009 (with the writer, Caroline Gaudriault)
 "Hypothèses", Éditions Paradoxe, 2011 (with the writer, Caroline Gaudriault)
 "Wonderful World", Éditions Paradoxe, 2012 (with the writer, Caroline Gaudriault)
 "A small man in a big world", Editions Paradoxe, 2014 - with the writer Caroline Gaudriault and Francis Fukuyama

References

External links
 

French photographers
20th-century photographers
21st-century photographers
Movie stills photographers
French photojournalists
Living people
1953 births
People from Talence
Officiers of the Ordre des Arts et des Lettres